Volvo Construction Equipment - Volvo CE - (originally Munktells, Bolinder-Munktell, Volvo BM) is a major international company which develops, manufactures, and markets equipment for construction and related industries. It is a subsidiary and business of the Volvo Group.

Overview 

Volvo CE's products include a range of wheel loaders, hydraulic excavators, articulated haulers, motor graders, soil and asphalt compactors, pavers, backhoe loaders, skid steers, and milling machines. Volvo CE has production facilities in the United States, Brazil, Scotland, Sweden, France, Germany, Poland, India, China, Russia, and South Korea.

Volvo CE sells machines under three brands: Volvo, SDLG, and Terex Trucks.

History 

Three men laid the foundation for Volvo Construction Equipment: Johan Theofron Munktell and two brothers Jean Bolinder and Carl Gerhard Bolinder.

In 1832, Johan Theofron Munktell who was then 27, began what became Volvo Construction Equipment in Eskilstuna, Sweden. In 1913, Munktell and his team produced Sweden's first tractor. Elsewhere in Sweden, other entrepreneurs were making progress. Jean and Carl Gerhard Bolinder, who were brothers from Stockholm, had been manufacturing steam engines and crude engine oil since 1844.

In 1932, a century after Johan Theofron Munktell’s began his company in Eskilstuna, Bolinder moved to Eskilstuna and both companies merged under the name AB Bolinder-Munktell. In 1934, Bolinder Munktell produced the legendary BM 25 tractor.

In 1950, Volvo bought the machine manufacturer Bolinder-Munktell (BM). Four years later in 1954, the company produced its first wheel loader H10. It was the world's first loader to feature a parallel lift arm system and attachment bracket, establishing Volvo as one of the leading construction companies in the world. They produced the world's first articulated hauler: the Volvo DR 631 Gravel Charlie-in 1966.

In 1973, the company changed its name to Volvo BM AB. In 1979, Valmet partnered with Volvo and produced tractors under the Volvo BM Valmet brand. Valmet and Massey Ferguson agreed to produce tractors at Massey Ferguson's factory in Beauvais, France. The tractor manufacturing division was sold to Valmet in 1985.Also in 1985, Volvo BM joined the American manufacturer Clark Equipment and its subsidiary Euclid Trucks. The product name Clark Michigan was abbreviated to Michigan and the three brand names Volvo BM, Michigan, and Euclid were incorporated in the new company VME Group.

In 1995, VME became a fully owned Volvo company and changed its name to Volvo Construction Equipment. In 1998, Volvo CE became the first foreign company to invest in Korea. The acquisition of Samsung Heavy Industries (Construction Equipment Division) increased its sales and presence in Asia.

In January 2007, Volvo purchased 70% of SDLG. In April of the same year, Volvo also finalized the acquisition of a division of the American company Ingersoll Rand. The division manufactures machines for road construction. In July 2020, Volvo Construction sold Blaw-Knox pavers to Gencor Industries Inc. which is in Orlando.

In December 2020, Volvo began delivering all-electric ECR25 Electric compact excavators to customers.

References

External links
Volvo Construction Equipment

Construction equipment manufacturers of Sweden
Construction
Companies established in 1832
Volvo Trucks
Diesel engine manufacturers
Forklift truck manufacturers